Oxley High School is a government-funded co-educational comprehensive secondary day school, located in North Tamworth, in the New England region of New South Wales, Australia.

Established in 1968, the school enrolled approximately 970 students in 2018, from Year 7 to Year 12, of whom 19 percent identified as Indigenous Australians and four percent were from a language background other than English. The school is operated by the NSW Department of Education; the principal is Simon Bartlett–Taylor.

Overview 
The school has four sport houses - Namoi (green), Castlereagh (blue), Macquarie (red) and Hastings (yellow). Oxley has 70 full-time teachers, and approximately twelve casual teachers at any one time. It caters for students, with additional learning needs, and provides intellectually moderate (IM) classes and support staff.

On 18 March 2012 the Castlereagh block of the school was destroyed by fire, and subsequently knocked down and rebuilt.

Notable alumni

Josh Hazlewood, an Australian international cricketer. Philip Quast, singer and actor.

See also 

 List of government schools in New South Wales
 Schools in Tamworth, New South Wales
 Education in Australia

References

External links
 

Buildings and structures in Tamworth, New South Wales
Public high schools in New South Wales
Educational institutions established in 1968
1968 establishments in Australia